Bequaertia is a genus of flowering plants belonging to the family Celastraceae.

Its native range is Tropical Africa.

Species:

Bequaertia mucronata

References

Celastraceae
Celastrales genera